</noinclude>

Enchoteuthis (meaning "spear squid") is an extinct genus of large enchoteuthine cephalopod that lived during the Cretaceous. Although it and its relative Tusoteuthis are often compared to squid, both are now thought to be more closely related to modern octopuses. Three species are currently recognized as valid: E. melanae, E. tonii, and E. cobbani.

Etymology
The generic name Enchoteuthis is derived from the Greek enchos ("spear") and teuthis ("squid"). The specific name melanae honors Melanie Bonner, who discovered the holotype. E. cobbani is named after William Cobban.

Distribution

E. melanae and E. cobbani are both known from the Late Cretaceous Western Interior Seaway of North America, with specimens found in Kansas, Wyoming, South Dakota, North Dakota, and Manitoba. E. tonii is known from the Early Cretaceous Eromanga Seaway of Australia. An additional unnamed species is known from the Late Cretaceous Paleo-Pacific Ocean of North America, specifically British Columbia and Alaska.

See also

Tusoteuthis
Muensterella
Cephalopod size

References

Late Cretaceous cephalopods of North America
Octopuses
Prehistoric cephalopod genera